Ice Princess is a 2005 American teen sports comedy-drama film directed by Tim Fywell, written by Hadley Davis from a story by Meg Cabot and Davis, and starring Joan Cusack, Michelle Trachtenberg, Kim Cattrall and Hayden Panettiere. The film focuses on Casey Carlyle, a normal teenager who gives up a promising future academic life in order to pursue her new-found dream of being a professional figure skater. The film was released on March 18, 2005. Ice Princess had a financially unsuccessful performance at the box office, grossing $24 million in the United States during its theatrical run against a production budget of $25 million.

Plot
Set in the fictional city of Millbrook, Connecticut, Casey Carlyle (Michelle Trachtenberg), a very smart and talented science student, pursues a scholarship to Harvard University. For the scholarship, she must present a personal summer project about physics. While watching a figure skating competition with her mathematically inclined best friend Ann, Casey realizes that her favorite childhood hobby, ice skating, would make a perfect project. She decides to try to improve her own skating by applying physics and what she has discovered from watching other skaters.

Casey becomes proficient and skips two levels to become a junior skater, following a recital. She helps junior skaters Gennifer "Gen" Harwood (Hayden Panettiere), Tiffany Lai (Jocelyn Lai), and Nikki Fletcher (Kirsten Olson) improve their skating by using algorithms generated by her computer. Torn between her Harvard dream and her growing love of skating, Casey has difficulty juggling schoolwork, skating, and a part-time job. Joan Carlyle (Joan Cusack), Casey's mother, attempts to prevent her daughter from skating due to her declining academic performance. Meanwhile, tension arises between Casey's mother and her coach Tina Harwood (Kim Cattrall), a disgraced former skater.

Tina, who manages the rink where Casey trains, has Gen on a strict training program. During a competition where both Casey and Gen compete, Tina sees Casey may outrank Gen and sabotages Casey's performance by buying her new skates. Unaware of the danger of unbroken-in skates, Casey's resulting long program is riddled with poor jumps and several falls. Upon being informed of Tina's intent behind her seemingly kind gesture, Casey lashes out at her and mistakenly assumes her children were equally involved in the plot. She ranks fifth in the competition and can only qualify for sectionals if any of the top four back out. As a result, Casey loses interest in skating and returns to her studies and goal of attending Harvard.

Upset at her mother's sabotage and frustrated by all the restrictions of training, Gen quits. While Casey and Gen reconcile, Casey can now qualify for sectionals as Gen quit. She declines the Harvard scholarship competition to devote herself to skating, to her mother's dismay. Casey asks Tina to be her personal coach and train for sectionals. Her mother, upset at this change of direction in her life, refuses to watch her skate.

At Sectionals, Casey is not fully focused on the competition, and falls while attempting a triple salchow jump. To her surprise, she sees her mother in the audience. Inspired, she gives a highly rated artistic performance. Sectionals ends with Nikki earning gold and Casey placing silver, both qualifying to go to Nationals and potentially the 2006 Winter Olympics. Gen's brother, Teddy (Trevor Blumas), gives Casey flowers to congratulate her; and they kiss. Later, Joan and Tina bicker about how many college courses Casey should take, her and Teddy's budding love, her sponsors, and her future in figure skating.

Cast

Joan Cusack as Joan Carlyle
Kim Cattrall as Tina Harwood
Michelle Trachtenberg as Casey Carlyle
Hayden Panettiere as Gennifer "Gen" Harwood
Trevor Blumas as Teddy Harwood
Erik King as Dr. Chip Healey
Diego Klattenhoff as Kyle Dayton
Kirsten Olson as Nikki Fletcher
Signe Ronka as Emma Flanders
Juliana Cannarozzo as Zoey Bloch
Paul Sun-Hyung Lee as Mr. Lai
Martha MacIsaac as Mean Party Girl
Connie Ray as Mrs. Fletcher
Michelle Kwan as ESPN reporter
Jocelyn Lai as Tiffany Lai
Shanique Ollivierre-Lake as Chantal DeGroat
Amy Stewart as Ann
Kristina Whitcomb as Ms. Fisher Lee

Production
Blumas said that he was put on hold for two months during the audition process and that there had been "a lot of switch-overs with the directors". Blumas ended up playing Teddy as a sort of father figure. He began training to drive a Zamboni soon after arriving in Toronto; according to him, he later ended up smoothing the ice on some mornings at the rink where they were shooting. Panettiere did much of her own skating, including a fast spin seen at the end of the regionals short program. Trachtenberg trained for eight months, including the time they were filming (during which time she says she worked twenty-hour days). She had to be on the ice longer than most of the other actors as she was one of the few adults on the film. She had stunt doubles to handle the falls and some of the complex moves, although Trachtenberg did learn a specific move that could not be done by a stunt double as the differences in their build would be apparent. She sustained some injuries while working on the film. According to Trachtenberg, a mistake was made in one of the physics formulas her character recites, which was later fixed; a shot of the back of her head was used and the correct term was looped in. Trachtenberg described the film as "not a Disney kitschy movie" and was somewhat apprehensive of the idea of a sequel for fear of belittling the original. Cusack noted that the relationship between Casey and her mother had already been well-developed in the script, but said that it generated a good deal of discussion during the production, and Cusack ultimately described her role as "meaningful" in terms of the acting and also how it related to her personally.

The film was shot from May 3 to July 23, 2004 at several locations in Toronto, including George Bell Arena, Western Technical-Commercial School, Christie Mansion and De La Salle College.

Reception

Box office
In its opening weekend, the film grossed $6,807,471 in 2,501 theaters in the United States and Canada, ranking #4 at the box office, behind The Ring Two, Robots and The Pacifier. By the end of its run, Ice Princess grossed $24,402,491 domestically and $3,243,000 internationally, totaling $27,645,491 worldwide.

Critical reception
On Rotten Tomatoes, the film has a score of 52% based on 109 reviews, with an average rating of 5.60/10. The consensus reads, "This likable Disney film gets points for effort, but can't stick the landing when it comes to originality." Film critic Roger Ebert gave Ice Princess three out of four stars and commended the film for its entertaining nature and ability to overcome cliche and "formula". Todd Gilchrist of IGN questioned the speed at which Casey becomes adept at skating and pointed out some other improbabilities and clichés, but strongly praised Cusack’s and Cattrall’s performances as emotionally powerful and fully human. United States Conference of Catholic Bishops' Office for Film and Broadcasting rated the film A-I (suitable for general patronage) and provided the film a modest praise as a good family film. Oppenheim Toy Portfolio awarded the film their platinum award. It is rated G by the Motion Picture Association of America.

Zahra Lari, a Muslim figure skater from the United Arab Emirates, cited Ice Princess as an inspiration for her career. A documentary about Lari and the film, highlighting Lari's career and Disney's influence on her, and including interviews with many involved in making the film, is currently in pre-production with Størmerlige Productions as a result of the #DreamBigPrincess campaign.

Soundtrack

Ice Princess: Original Soundtrack was released on March 15, 2005, in the United States by Walt Disney Records, features tracks by Natasha Bedingfield, Emma Roberts, Hayden Panettiere, Michelle Branch, Aly & AJ, Jesse McCartney, and Raven-Symoné, and various others. It peaked at number 53 on the Billboard 200 and at number 2 on Top Soundtracks.

Track listing
"Reach" - Caleigh Peters
"If I Had It My Way" - Emma Roberts
"Get Your Shine On" - Jesse McCartney
"You Set Me Free" - Michelle Branch
"Reachin' for Heaven" - Diana DeGarmo
"No One" - Aly & AJ
"It's Oh So Quiet" - Lucy Woodward
"Get Up" - Superchick
"I Fly" - Hayden Panettiere
"Just a Dream" - Jump5
"Bump" - Raven-Symoné
"There Is No Alternative" - Tina Sugandh
"Unwritten" - Natasha Bedingfield

Not included on the soundtrack.
 "Ray of Light" by Madonna appears in the background of Casey Carlyle's scene of the regional competition but is not included on the soundtrack.
 "Freak Out" by Avril Lavigne appears in the official trailer but is not included on the soundtrack.
 Instrumental versions of "Toxic" by Britney Spears and "Trouble" by Pink were included in the ice skating scenes from Zoey, but not included on the soundtrack.

References

External links

2005 films
2005 romantic comedy-drama films
2005 soundtrack albums
2000s sports comedy-drama films
2000s teen comedy-drama films
American romantic comedy-drama films
American sports comedy-drama films
American teen comedy-drama films
Disney film soundtracks
Figure skating films
Films about women's sports
Films directed by Tim Fywell
Films scored by Christophe Beck
Films set in Connecticut
Films shot in Toronto
Films about mother–daughter relationships
Sports film soundtracks
Teen sports films
Walt Disney Pictures films
2000s English-language films
2000s American films